KRPH is a radio station in Arizona.

KRPH may also refer to:
 Kalamazoo Regional Psychiatric Hospital
 KRPH, ICAO code for Graham Municipal Airport in Texas